Ceriporia albomellea is a species of crust fungus in the family Irpicaceae. Found in China, it was described as new to science in 2017 by mycologists Yuan Yuan, Xiao-Hong Ji, Fang Wu, and Jia-Jia Chen. The fungus is characterized by its thin crust-like fruit body with a cottony white margin, and      
white to cinnamon-buff pores; it is this latter feature for which the fungus is named. Its spores are oblong to ellipsoid and measure 3.1–3.8 by 1.7–2 μm. The type locality is southern China's Hainan Island, a location rich with wood-inhabiting fungi.

References

Fungi described in 2017
Fungi of China
Irpicaceae